Cyclosiella dulcicula is a moth of the family Erebidae first described by Charles Swinhoe in 1890. It is found in southern India, the northeast Indian state of Assam, Sri Lanka and Myanmar.

Description
In the female, the head and prothorax are orange. The mesothorax, metathorax and forewings are purplish grey. A broad orange band runs from the base along the costal and outer areas with a dark line, on which few scales can be found that defining two colours. Hindwings pale fuscous with ochreous margins and cilia.

References

Moths described in 1912
Cisthenina